The Madonna of the Pinks (c. 1506 – 1507) is an early devotional painting usually attributed to Italian Renaissance master Raphael. It is painted in oils on fruitwood and now hangs in the National Gallery, London.

Subject matter

The painting depicts a youthful Virgin Mary playing with the Christ child and handing him carnations. (The Italian title, La Madonna dei garofani actually means The Madonna of the Carnation.) These flowers, whose botanical name is dianthus (Greek for ‘flower of God’), are a premonition of Christ's Passion – according to Christian legend, the flower first appeared when the Virgin wept at the Crucifixion. The event takes place in a dimly-lit domestic setting influenced by Netherlandish art. The composition is based closely on the Benois Madonna by Leonardo da Vinci, although the colour scheme of blues and greens that link the Virgin with the landscape is Raphael's own. Through the arched window is a landscape with a ruined building, symbolising the collapse of the pagan world at the birth of Christ.

Provenance

The subject matter and size of the painting, little larger than a Book of Hours, suggest that it may have been intended as a portable aid to prayer. The identity of its original patron is unknown, although an inventory from the 1850s suggests that it was commissioned for Maddalena degli Oddi, a member of a prominent Perugian family, after she had taken holy orders.

In the 19th century it was property of the painter Vincenzo Camuccini.

Attribution to Raphael

Only in 1991 was the painting identified as a genuine Raphael, by the Renaissance scholar Nicholas Penny. Although Raphael scholars were aware of the existence of the work, which had hung in Alnwick Castle since 1853, they considered it merely the best of several copies of a lost original. After a major public appeal the Madonna of the Pinks was bought in 2004 by the National Gallery from the Duke of Northumberland for £34.88 million, with contributions from the Heritage Lottery Fund and the National Art Collections Fund. To justify the expenditure it went on a nationwide tour to Manchester, Cardiff, Edinburgh and Barnard Castle.

In the summer of 2006, Caruzzi et al. published online research which alleged that Nicholas Penny's attribution and the associated defence of it published by the National Gallery are based on incomplete analysis, untenable arguments and misinterpretations. In 2007 the posthumous publication of James Beck, From Duccio to Raphael: Connoisseurship in Crisis disputed the attribution of the National Gallery's painting Madonna of the Pinks to Raphael. Brian Sewell notably criticised the painting of being of low quality and possibly forged, pointing out how the Madonna's right leg seems disconnected from her body.

Painting materials
The palette is relatively limited compared to other works by Raphael. The sky and the blue drapery of the Virgin are painted in natural ultramarine and azurite, he further employed lead-tin yellow, malachite and verdigris.

See also
List of paintings by Raphael

References
 National Gallery, London press release upon acquisition of the painting in 2004
 2004 Review: The Annual Report of the National Art Collections Fund
 Article and link to paper by Desiderio Z. Caruzzi on the attribution of the Madonna of the Pinks to Raphael

Notes

External links
 

Paintings of the Madonna and Child by Raphael
Collections of the National Gallery, London
1500s paintings
Nude art
Paintings of the Madonna and Child